Spilostethus hospes, the darth maul bug, is a species of seed bug in the family Lygaeidae. It is found in Asia, Australasia, and Oceania.  Its common name is a reference to the Star Wars character Darth Maul, who shares similar markings.

Ecology
Females tend to be more frequent than males.  To date, only one population of Spilostethus hospes has been identified to carry a male-killing endosymbiotic bacterium.  This bacteria has been shown to only kill males in this population, which may be one of the reasons that show a higher frequency of females.

References

External links

 

Lygaeidae
Insect pests of millets